The 22nd Iris Awards ceremony, presented by the newspaper El País, honored the best of radio, television and social networks in Uruguay of 2016 and took place at the Radisson Montevideo Victoria Plaza Hotel, Montevideo. It was held on April 2, 2017, and was broadcast by Teledoce, Channel 4, Channel 10 and VTV. The ceremony did not have a single host, but different presenters hosted it for a certain time, thus fulfilling a time for the channel that transmitted the event.

During the ceremony, El País presented Iris Awards to television in 17 categories, and to radio in 7. It also presented the Golden Iris Award, the Iris for Career and the Platinum Iris.

Winners and nominees

Television

Radio

Other awards 

Source:

References 

2017 in Uruguayan television
2017 television awards
2017 television specials
April 2017 events in South America